FF1 may refer to:
Mozilla Firefox 
Fantastic Four, the first movie in the Fantastic Four series
Fatal Frame, the first game in the Fatal Frame series
Final Fantasy (video game), the first game in the Final Fantasy series
Final Fight, the first game in the Final Fight series
Fatal Fury: King of Fighters, the first game in the Fatal Fury series
PRR FF1, a locomotive of the Pennsylvania Railroad